Francis Shankland (1 September 1910 – 15 July 1973) was a Guyanese cricketer. He played in one first-class match for British Guiana in 1928/29.

See also
 List of Guyanese representative cricketers

References

External links
 

1910 births
1973 deaths
Guyanese cricketers
Guyana cricketers